Herget is a German surname. Notable people with the surname include:

Jimmy Herget (born 1993), American baseball player
Kevin Herget (born 1991), American baseball player
Matthias Herget (born 1955), German footballer and manager
Paul Herget (1908–1981), American astronomer
Wilhelm Herget (1910–1974), German World War II flying ace
Dr. Gerhard Herget (1936-1998), geologist with patent

See also
1751 Herget, a main-belt asteroid

German-language surnames
Surnames from nicknames